İsmet Yılmaz (born December 10, 1961) is a Turkish politician. Previously he was Minister of National Defense and Minister of National Education. Also briefly served as the Speaker of the Grand National Assembly. Prior to entering politics, he worked as a law consultant and mechanical engineer.

Early life and education
İsmet Yılmaz was born in Gürün, Sivas Province. Following his primary education in his hometown, he enrolled in Haydarpaşa High School in Istanbul. Then, he studied mechanical engineering at the School of Maritime in Istanbul Technical University, graduating in 1982 with a bachelor's degree. Yılmaz attended then Istanbul University's Faculty of Law for education in maritime law and finished in 1987. He continued his further studies in "technical management in maritime" at the World Maritime University in Malmö, Sweden earning a master's degree. He received another master's degree in law from the Institute of Social Sciences in Marmara University, Istanbul. Finally, İsmet Yılmaz received a Doctor of Law degree from the Institute of Social Sciences at Ankara University.

Career

Government
After serving twenty years as an engineer and a law consultant, he became Undersecretary of Maritime Affairs at the Ministry of Transport and Communication on December 31, 2002. In accordance with Article 114 of the Constitution of Turkey, he was appointed neutral Minister of Transport and Communication on May 8, 2007, as placeholder for Binali Yıldırım until the 2007 general elections. Yılmaz was appointed Undersecretary at the Ministry of Culture and Tourism on November 1, 2007.

He entered politics as a member of the AK Party and became deputy for Sivas Province following the 2011 general elections. On July 6, 2011, Yılmaz was appointed Minister of National Defence in the Cabinet Erdoğan III. During his first term as Minister of Defense, he praised Turkey's affiliation to NATO and saw its membership as the result of values like democracy and human rights that Turkey was defending.

Speaker of Parliament
Yılmaz was put forward as the AKP's candidate for Speaker of the Grand National Assembly for the June–July 2015 speaker elections. Since the AKP did not have a majority (276 seats) in Parliament, the election went into a fourth and final round where Yılmaz managed to win a simple majority of the vote on 1 July 2015. He was thus elected as the Speaker with 258 votes (exactly the same number of votes as AKP MPs) to rival Deniz Baykal's 182 votes.

Personal life
İsmet Yılmaz is married and has three children.

References

External links 

1961 births
People from Gürün
Haydarpaşa High School alumni
Istanbul Technical University alumni
Istanbul University Faculty of Law alumni
Turkish mechanical engineers
Turkish jurists
Marmara University alumni
Ankara University alumni
Deputies of Sivas
Justice and Development Party (Turkey) politicians
Ministers of Transport and Communications of Turkey
Ministers of National Defence of Turkey
Government ministers of Turkey
Speakers of the Parliament of Turkey
Members of the 24th Parliament of Turkey
Members of the 25th Parliament of Turkey
Members of the 26th Parliament of Turkey
Members of the 64th government of Turkey
Members of the 65th government of Turkey
Living people
Members of the Grand National Assembly of Turkey